Gilles Durand (born 11 January 1952) is a Canadian former cyclist. He competed at the 1972 Summer Olympics and the 1976 Summer Olympics.

References

External links
 

1952 births
Living people
Canadian male cyclists
Olympic cyclists of Canada
Cyclists at the 1972 Summer Olympics
Cyclists at the 1976 Summer Olympics
Cyclists from Montreal